Before merging with Singapore Airlines, SilkAir was flying to three destinations at the end of April 2021. As the regional wing of Singapore Airlines, it operated flights to Asia and Australia from its hub at Changi Airport. On 6 May 2021, the last SilkAir flight landed from Kathmandu.

List

References

External links

Lists of airline destinations
Destinations